The Uttam Jeevan Raksha Padak is a civilian lifesaving award presented by the Government of India. Established on 30 September 1961, the award was originally called the Jeevan Raksha Padak, Class II.

Criteria
The Uttam Jeevan Raksha Padak is awarded to civilians to reward saving lives from drowning, fire, or mine accidents. It is awarded for "courage and promptitude under circumstances of very great danger to the life of the rescue".

The Uttam Jeevan Raksha Padak may be awarded to members of the armed forces, police, or fire services when recognizable acts take place outside beyond the course of their duty. Subsequent awards are recognized by the addition of a medal bar to the ribbon. The medal may be awarded posthumously.

Appearance
The Uttam Jeevan Raksha Padak is a circular silver medal  in diameter. On the obverse in the centre is an open hand in the Abhayamudra pose with Ma Bhai above and Uttam Jeevan Raksha Padak below in Devanagri script. The reverse bears the Emblem of India and the motto Satyameva Jayate.

At the edges are light blue stripes and two green centre stripes in the middle of the ribbon. These colors are meant to represent fire (red), water (blue), and life (green).

References

External links

Civil awards and decorations of India
Courage awards